Kresta Bay or Kresta Gulf (Zaliv Kresta) is a large bay of the Gulf of Anadyr on the southern coast of the Chukotka Peninsula, Russian Federation. Administratively the bay is part of the Iultinsky District of Chukotka.

Geography
The Kresta Bay is open towards the south; it is almost 100 km in length and has an average width of about 43 km. There are two inlets and a coastal lagoon enclosed by a landspit inside the bay.

Kresta Bay is now a tourist destination. Kresta Bay Airport, served by Chukotavia, is located by Egvekinot, a small harbor in the bay.

History
This bay was first surveyed by Russian mariner Count Fyodor Petrovich Litke in 1828.

References

External links
Waders in Kresta Bay

Bays of Chukotka Autonomous Okrug
Bays of the Bering Sea